Tazeh Kand (also Romanized as Tāzeh Kand; also known as Amīnābād and Tāzeh Kand-e Ūjān) is a village in Ujan-e Sharqi Rural District, Tekmeh Dash District, Bostanabad County, East Azerbaijan Province, Iran. At the 2006 census, its population was 134, in 31 families.

References 

Populated places in Bostanabad County